Fritz Funke (24 December 1907 – 9 May 1977) was a German racing cyclist. He rode in the 1936 Tour de France.

References

1907 births
1977 deaths
German male cyclists
Place of birth missing
Sportspeople from Chemnitz
Cyclists from Saxony